Daniel Solsona Puig (born 18 January 1952) is a Spanish former professional footballer who played as a midfielder.

Club career
Born in Cornellà de Llobregat, Barcelona, Catalonia, Solsona played in 373 La Liga games over 13 seasons in which he represented RCD Español and Valencia CF, scoring 65 goals in the process. He made his debut in the competition at only 18, featuring for the former in a 0–0 home draw against Real Sociedad on 27 September 1970.

In summer 1978, Solsona signed for the Che, scoring eight goals in 31 matches in his first year to help the team to the seventh position and also winning the Copa del Rey. Subsequently, he added eight appearances as the club conquered the UEFA Cup Winners' Cup, including the full 120 minutes of the final against Arsenal.

Solsona moved abroad at the age of 31, going on to spend four years at the service of SC Bastia and Stade Rennais F.C. in Ligue 1 interspersed with a very short spell with Racing Club de France football Colombes 92. He returned home in 1987, retiring after two seasons in the lower leagues with UE Sant Andreu.

International career
Solsona earned seven caps for Spain, in roughly eight years. His first appearance was on 17 October 1973, in a 0–0 friendly with Turkey in Istanbul.

Honours
Valencia
Copa del Rey: 1978–79
UEFA Cup Winners' Cup: 1979–80
UEFA Super Cup: 1980

References

External links

CiberChe biography and stats 

1952 births
Living people
People from Cornellà de Llobregat
Sportspeople from the Province of Barcelona
Spanish footballers
Footballers from Catalonia
Association football midfielders
La Liga players
Tercera División players
RCD Espanyol footballers
Valencia CF players
UE Sant Andreu footballers
Ligue 1 players
Ligue 2 players
SC Bastia players
Racing Club de France Football players
Stade Rennais F.C. players
Spain youth international footballers
Spain amateur international footballers
Spain international footballers
Catalonia international footballers
Spanish expatriate footballers
Expatriate footballers in France
Spanish expatriate sportspeople in France
Spanish football managers